Løkin or Lokin is a surname. Notable people with the surname include:
 J. H. A. Lokin (born 1945), Dutch historian
 Abraham Løkin (born 1959), Faroese footballer
 Bogi Løkin (born 1988), Faroese footballer and poet
 Karl Løkin, Faroese footballer

See also 
 Við Løkin, stadium in Runavík, Faroe Islands